Walter Dobler (December 26, 1919 – November 5, 1995) was an American professional football player for the Winnipeg Blue Bombers. He played college football at the University of North Dakota.

References

1919 births
1995 deaths
American football quarterbacks
Canadian football quarterbacks
American players of Canadian football
North Dakota Fighting Hawks football players
Winnipeg Blue Bombers players
Players of American football from North Dakota
People from Emmons County, North Dakota